Adam J. Bilzerian (born 1983) is an 
Armenian-Nevisian poker player and writer. He was born and raised in the United States.

Early life
Bilzerian, the son of Armenian-American corporate takeover specialist Paul Bilzerian and his wife, Terri L. Steffen, grew up in Florida. He has one brother, Dan Bilzerian. He attended Gaither High School, where he represented his school in tennis.

On June 11, 2001, FBI agents raided the Bilzerian residence in Tampa, Florida, in relation to charges of market manipulation against Paul Bilzerian. A neighbour described the raid as "pure intimidation". Paul Bilzerian would be held in prison and was not permitted to attend his son's high school graduation. In the aftermath, Bilzerian would question his dream of becoming an Army Green Beret; in press interviews, he asked, "How can you go in and fight for your country when this is what they're doing to [your father]?" 

He went on to study at Vanderbilt University, earning a B.A. in history. Here, he witnessed the 2004 United States presidential election which he reportedly saw as a bad sign and began to look into emigrating from the U.S. and establishing himself abroad. In 2007, he purchased a residence in Saint Kitts and Nevis, and the following year went on to become a citizen of the country, relinquishing U.S. citizenship in the process. In 2018, he obtained Armenian citizenship.

Poker career
Bilzerian came in 47th in the 2009 World Series of Poker, winning $138,568. His brother Dan also participated in the tournament; their performance led Norman Chad to nickname them the "Flying Bilzerian Brothers". He participated in the 2010 World Series of Poker as well.

He played poker privately with baseball player Alex Rodriguez at the Bellagio in Las Vegas, and was reportedly surprised by Rodriguez' skill; he was quoted as stating, "Alex busted everyone except me. I was like whoa, this guy can play. He had an amazing run. He won about $20,000 and left with everyone's money."

Works
 .

References

1983 births
Living people
Gaither High School alumni
Writers from Tampa, Florida
People who renounced United States citizenship
American emigrants to Saint Kitts and Nevis
American people of Armenian descent
American poker players
Vanderbilt University alumni
Naturalized citizens of Armenia